Midnight Resistance is a German synthpop musical group. 
The band started as a solo project of Nico, since the end of 2007 Gorden and Gregsen completed the current band line-up. Midnight Resistance released their debut album "Remote" on the label A Different Drum in August 2008.
In the second half of 2009 the band signed to the German label "Remote-Music / Sony-Music", where they will release their forthcoming album in 2010.

Members

 Nico - Synthesizer, Guitar, Songwriting, Vocals
 Gorden -  Guitar
 Gregsen - Synthesizer

Discography
 Full-length albums
 Remote (2008, A Different Drum)
 The Mirror Cage (2012, Farscape-Records / Alive)
 Compilation & Remixed
 Dopamin 3 (2007, Codeline Records)
 Synthpop Club Anthems 5 (2008, A Different Drum)
 A Different Mix 6 (2009, A Different Drum)

Source: Band Website

External links
Official Website
 Official Myspace Page
Remote-Music / Sony-Music
A Different Drum

German synthpop groups
Musical groups established in 2007